Potrika is a British Bengali-language weekly newspaper.

See also
British Bangladeshi
List of newspapers in London

References

External links

1997 establishments in England
Newspapers established in 1997
Newspapers published in London
Bengali-language newspapers
Weekly newspapers published in the United Kingdom
National newspapers published in the United Kingdom
British Bangladeshi mass media

bn:পত্রিকা